Ronald Alan Fintushel (born 1945) is an American mathematician, specializing in low-dimensional geometric topology (specifically of 4-manifolds) and the mathematics of gauge theory.

Education and career
Fintushel studied mathematics at Columbia University with a bachelor's degree in 1967 and at the University of Illinois at Urbana–Champaign with a master's degree in 1969. In 1975 he received his Ph.D. from the State University of New York at Binghamton with thesis Orbit maps of local -actions on manifolds of dimension less than five  under the supervision of Louis McAuley. Fintushel was a professor at Tulane University and is a professor at Michigan State University.

His research deals with geometric topology, in particular of 4-manifolds (including the computation of Donaldson and Seiberg-Witten invariants) with links to gauge theory, knot theory, and symplectic geometry. He works closely with Ronald J. Stern.

In 1998 he was an Invited Speaker, with Ronald J. Stern, with talk Construction of smooth 4-manifolds at the International Congress of Mathematicians in Berlin. In 1997 Fintushel received the Distinguished Faculty Award from Michigan State University. In 2016 a conference was held in his honor at Tulane University.

He was elected a Fellow of the American Mathematical Society. Fintushel is a member of the editorial boards of Geometry & Topology and the Michigan Mathematical Journal.

Selected publications
with Stern: Constructing lens spaces by surgery on knots, Mathematische Zeitschrift, vol. 175, 1980, pp. 33–51 
with Stern: Pseudofree orbifolds, Annals of Mathematics, vol. 122, 1985, pp. 335–364
with Stern: Instanton homology of Seifert fibred homology three spheres, Proceedings of the London Mathematical Society, vol. 61, 1990, pp. 109–137
with Stern: Immersed spheres in 4-manifolds and the immersed Thom conjecture, Turkish Journal of Mathematics, vol. 19, 1995, pp. 145–157
with Stern: Donaldson invariants of 4-manifolds with simple type, J. Diff. Geom., vol. 42, 1995, pp. 577–633
with Stern: The blowup formula for Donaldson invariants, Annals of Mathematics, vol.  143, 1996, pp. 529–546 arXiv
with Stern: Rational blowdowns of smooth 4-manifolds, Journal of Differential Geometry, vol. 46, 1997, pp. 181–235 arXiv
with Stern: Surfaces in 4-manifolds, Math. Res. Letters, vol. 4, 1997, pp. 907–914 arXiv
with Stern: Knots, links, and 4-manifolds, Inventiones mathematicae, vol. 134, 1998, pp. 363–400, arXiv
with Stern: Constructions of smooth 4-manifolds. Proceedings of the International Congress of Mathematicians, Vol. II (Berlin, 1998). Doc. Math. 1998, Extra Vol. II, 443–452
with Stern: Symplectic surfaces in a fixed homology class, J. Diff. Geom., vol. 52, 2000, pp. 203–222
with Stern: Families of simply connected 4-manifolds with the same Seiberg-Witten invariants, Topology, vol. 43, 2004, pp. 1449–1467	
with Stern: Invariants for Lagrangian tori, Geom. Topol., vol. 8, 2004, pp., 947-968 arXiv
with Stern: Tori in symplectic 4-manifolds, Geometry and Topology Monographs, vol. 7, 2004, Proceedings of the Casson Fest, pp. 311–333
with Stern, B. D. Park: Reverse engineering small 4-manifolds, Algebraic & Geometric Topology, vol. 7, 2007, pp. 2103–2116 arXiv
with Stern: Six Lectures on Four 4-manifolds, Low dimensional topology, IAS/Park City Math. Ser. 15, Amer. Math. Soc., Providence, RI, 2009, pp. 265–315

See also
Fintushel–Stern knot

References

1946 births
Living people
20th-century American mathematicians
21st-century American mathematicians
Topologists
Columbia University alumni
University of Illinois Urbana-Champaign alumni
Binghamton University alumni
Tulane University faculty
Michigan State University faculty
Fellows of the American Mathematical Society